The Governor Samuel Price House, also known as the Preston House, is a historic home located at Lewisburg, Greenbrier County, West Virginia. It was the residence of Samuel Price. It was built in the 1830s, and is a two-story brick dwelling on a cut stone foundation, with a rectangular main section and ell on the western side. It has a hipped roof on the main section and gable roof on the ell.   Also on the property are two brick octagonal dependencies; a bath and a smokehouse.

It was listed on the National Register of Historic Places in 1975.

References

Houses on the National Register of Historic Places in West Virginia
Houses in Greenbrier County, West Virginia
Houses completed in 1830
National Register of Historic Places in Greenbrier County, West Virginia
Greek Revival houses in West Virginia
1830 establishments in Virginia